Hendrik B. Kruger (born 30 July 1991) is a South African cyclist, who currently rides for South African amateur team Alfa Bodyworks–Titan Racing.

Major results

2013
 10th Road race, African Road Championships
2015
 African Games
1st  Team time trial
5th Time trial
9th Road race
 African Track Championships
1st  Individual pursuit
1st  Team pursuit
 1st  Individual pursuit, National Track Championships
 KZN Autumn Series
1st Mayday Classic
2nd PMB Road Classic
2nd Hibiscus Cycle Classic
 5th Road race, National Road Championships
2016
 3rd Overall Mpumalanga Tour
2019
 1st Amashova Durban Classic
 1st  Mountains classification Tour of Good Hope
 8th Overall Tour de Limpopo

References

External links
 
 
 

1991 births
Living people
South African male cyclists
People from Potchefstroom
African Games gold medalists for South Africa
African Games medalists in cycling
Competitors at the 2015 African Games
20th-century South African people
21st-century South African people